Leucaster is a genus of flowering plants belonging to the family Nyctaginaceae.

Its native range is Southeastern Brazil.

Species:
 Leucaster caniflorus Choisy

References

Nyctaginaceae
Caryophyllales genera
Taxa named by Jacques Denys Choisy